Allonnia is a genus of coeloscleritophoran known as complete scleritomes from the Middle Cambrian Burgess Shale.  It is also a constituent of the small shelly fauna.

Its earliest occurrence in Yunnan dates to the Upper Meishucunian (~ Tommotian / Cambrian Stage 2)

References

Burgess Shale fossils
Enigmatic prehistoric animal genera
Fossil taxa described in 1965
Cambrian genus extinctions